Tatiana Nikolaevna Mishina, née: Oleneva (Оленева) is a Russian figure skating coach and former competitor for the Soviet. She is the 1973 Soviet national champion.

Career 
Mishina won bronze at the 1972 Prize of Moscow News. She then won the Soviet national title and was assigned to the 1973 European Championships where she finished 14th. Following her retirement from competition, she began coaching.

Mishina's current students include:
 Sofia Samodurova
 Evgeni Semenenko
 Anastasiia Guliakova
Her former students include: 
 Natalia Ogoreltseva
 Maria Stavitskaia
 Artur Gachinski 
 Ksenia Doronina
 Andrei Lutai (second coach)
 Elizaveta Nugumanova
 Andrei Zuber
 Alexander Petrov
 Andrei Lazukin
 Alisa Lozko

Personal life 
Oleneva married her former coach Alexei Mishin. They have two sons, both of whom play tennis.

Results

References

External links 
 info

Navigation

Soviet female single skaters
Living people
Soviet figure skating coaches
1954 births
Figure skaters from Saint Petersburg
Female sports coaches